Roger Ball may refer to:
Roger Ball (designer), professor of industrial design at the Hong Kong Polytechnic University
Roger Ball (musician) (born 1944), Scottish saxophonist, keyboardist, songwriter and arranger
Roger Ball (MP) ( 1395–1407), English politician